Couratari atrovinosa is a species of flowering plant in the family Lecythidaceae. It is endemic to Brazil, where it is known only from Amazonas.

References

atrovinosa
Endemic flora of Brazil
Endangered plants
Taxonomy articles created by Polbot